The Apostolic Prefecture of Kampong Cham is a territorial subdivision of the Roman Catholic Church in Cambodia.

The prefecture covers an area of 66,347 km2 of eastern Cambodia, covering the provinces of Kampong Cham, Kratié, Stung Treng, Ratanakiri, Mondulkiri, Svay Rieng, Tboung Khmum and Prey Veng. As of 2002, of the 4.2 million citizen 3,460 are member of the Catholic Church. The prefecture is subdivided into 24 parishes, and has 13 priests altogether.

History
The prefecture was erected on September 26, 1968, when the Apostolic Vicariate of Phnom Penh (which was until then responsible for all of Cambodia) was split into three parts.

Ordinaries
André Lesouëf, M.E.P.: September 26, 1968 – 1997 (retired)
Antonysamy Susairaj, M.E.P.: May 27, 2000 – July 25, 2019 (resigned)
Pierre Suon Hangly: appointed July 15, 2022

See also
 List of Catholic dioceses in Laos and Cambodia

References

External links
GCatholic.org
Catholiccambodia
Catholic-Hierarchy 

Kompong Cham
Kompong Cham
Christian organizations established in 1968
Kompong